Mícheál Ó Ceallaigh was an Irish scribe.

Ó Ceallaigh is known from only a very few manuscripts, such as LN G. 751. His work contains songs by Antoine Ó Raifteiri, stories of the Fianna, and may have known Lady Gregory. One of his manuscripts bears the date 1875.

See also

 Mary Bonaventure Browne
 Dubhaltach Mac Fhirbhisigh
 Daibhidh Ó Duibhgheannáin
 Ruaidhrí Ó Flaithbheartaigh
 Seán Ó Catháin

References

 Scríobhaithe Lámhscríbhinní Gaeilge I nGaillimh 1700-1900, William Mahon, in "Galway:History and Society", 1997

People from County Galway
Irish-language writers
Irish scribes